Agegnehu Teshager is a politician from Ethiopia who served as Speaker of House of Federation from October 2021 and President of Amhara Region.

References 

Ethiopian politicians
Spokespersons of the House of Federation
Living people
Year of birth missing (living people)